There is another Senegalese division 1 basketball player of this name, born in 1982.

Fatou Dieng (born August 18, 1983) is a Senegalese female basketball player. She is also a French citizen.

References

External links
Fatou Dieng on FIBA.com

1983 births
Living people
Naturalized citizens of France
Point guards
Senegalese women's basketball players
Basketball players at the 2016 Summer Olympics
Olympic basketball players of Senegal
Senegalese expatriate basketball people in Spain
Senegalese expatriate basketball people in France
African Games gold medalists for Senegal
African Games medalists in basketball
Competitors at the 2007 All-Africa Games